Geum macrophyllum, commonly known as largeleaf avens or large-leaved avens is a flowering plant found from the Arctic south to the northern U.S. states, and in the Rocky Mountains and west to the Sierra Nevada in California and as far south as Northwestern Mexico.

It is even more distinctive in fruit than in flower, with spiky spheres of reddish styles. The fruits are a ball of tiny velcro like hooks that catch on clothing and animal hair.

Uses

The Squamish made a diuretic tea out of the leaves.
The Haida made a steam bath with boiled roots to treat rheumatic pain. Some tribes used the plant in eyewashes, to treat stomach ailments, and to aid childbirth.

References

External links

Jepson Manual Treatment — Geum macrophyllum
Geum macrophyllum — Photo gallery

macrophyllum
Alpine flora
Flora of Eastern Asia
Flora of Eastern Canada
Flora of Subarctic America
Flora of the North-Central United States
Flora of the Northeastern United States
Flora of the Northwestern United States
Flora of the Russian Far East
Flora of the Southwestern United States
Flora of Western Canada
Flora without expected TNC conservation status